Jean Frédéric Frenet (7 February 1816 – 12 June 1900) was a French mathematician, astronomer, and meteorologist.  He was born and died in Périgueux, France.

He is best known for being an independent co-discoverer of the Frenet–Serret formulas.  He wrote six out of the nine formulas, which at that time were not expressed in vector notation.  These formulas are important in the theory of space curves (differential geometry), and they were presented in his doctoral thesis at Toulouse in 1847.  That year he became a professor at Toulouse, and one year later, 1848, he became professor of mathematics at Lyon.  He also was director of an astronomical observatory at Lyon.  Four years later, in 1852, he published the Frenet formulas in the Journal de Mathématiques Pures et Appliquées.

In 1856 his calculus primer was first published, which ran through seven editions, the last one published posthumously in 1917.

External links
 

People from Périgueux
1816 births
1900 deaths
19th-century French mathematicians
École Normale Supérieure alumni
19th-century French astronomers
19th-century French writers
French male writers
19th-century French male writers